Uniform distribution may refer to:

 Continuous uniform distribution
 Discrete uniform distribution
 Uniform distribution (ecology)
 Equidistributed sequence

See also

 Homogeneous distribution